Achinta Sheuli (born 24 November 2001) is an Indian weightlifter who competes in the 73 kg weight class.

At the 2022 Commonwealth Games, he set a Games record of 313 kg and won gold. He lifted 143 kg in snatch (Games Record & equal to his previous personal best) and 170 kg in clean & jerk. 

He won the silver medal at the 2021 Junior World Weightlifting Championships and is a two-time Commonwealth Championships gold medalist.

Early life 
Sheuli was born in a lower middle class Bengali family at Deulpur, Panchla in Howrah district. He studied in Deulpur High School. He started weightlifting in 2011. His father Pratik Sheuli was a manual laborer who passed away in April 2013. His elder brother Alok was also a weightlifter but dropped out to support his career and the family.  Achinta helped his mother and brother in their embroidery work that called for precision, even as he was training for weightlifting that called for power.

Sheuli participated in Youth National Games in Haryana and stood in the third position. He won the Junior National level weightlifting tournament in 2013 for 50kg weight class and got a chance to enter the Army Sports Institute, Pune in 2014.

References

External links

Living people
2001 births
Indian male weightlifters
Weightlifters from West Bengal
People from Howrah district
21st-century Indian people
Weightlifters at the 2022 Commonwealth Games
Commonwealth Games gold medallists for India
Commonwealth Games medallists in weightlifting
Medallists at the 2022 Commonwealth Games